Anton Smith (born 9 November 1985) is a former English footballer who played as a striker.

Club career
In 2000, at the age of 14, Smith joined the academy at Crystal Palace from local club Interwood. In April 2005, Smith signed for Finnish club TP-47. During his time in Finland, Smith made six appearances for TP-47, all coming in the Veikkausliiga. Following his spell in Finland, Smith returned to England, signing for Wealdstone. In 2006, Smith joined Erith & Belvedere.

Coaching career
Following his playing career, Smith moved into coaching and scouting. Smith has scouted for Braintree Town, Leatherhead, and Reading. In 2017, Smith was named as head coach, under Qayum Shakoor, at Waltham Forest. In 2018, Smith followed Shakoor to Crawley Town under-23's.

References

1985 births
Living people
Footballers from Hackney, London
Association football forwards
English footballers
TP-47 players
Wealdstone F.C. players
Erith & Belvedere F.C. players
Veikkausliiga players
Association football scouts
Association football coaches
English expatriate footballers
English expatriate sportspeople in Finland
Expatriate footballers in Finland
Crawley Town F.C. non-playing staff
Reading F.C. non-playing staff
Black British sportspeople
Southend United F.C. non-playing staff
Norwich City F.C. non-playing staff